Fairhaven High School and Academy is a public high school in Fairhaven, Massachusetts, United States. Its main building, built in 1905, is known as the "Castle on the Hill" and it is part of the Fairhaven Public Schools district. The school was voted the "most beautiful high school in Massachusetts" in 2017.

The school building was added to the National Register of Historic Places in 1981. The building was donated in 1906 by Henry Huttleston Rogers, who was one of the key men in John D. Rockefeller's Standard Oil Trust.

It is one of two high schools taking in Acushnet students, along with New Bedford High School of New Bedford Public Schools.

History 
In 2006 about 100 of the students came from Acushnet. In April 2007 it had 19 Acushnet students about to graduate. Previously the school was only allowed to take up to 25 incoming 9th students from Acushnet, but the limit was removed in 2007 and the new provision was that until the school's student numbers reach 97% of the school's official capacity, any Acushnet high school-aged student is welcome to apply to attend. The anticipated number of incoming 9th graders from Acushnet to begin going to Fairhaven in fall 2007 was 35.

In 2009 there were fewer than 115 Acushnet students at Fairhaven High, and in 2011 that figure was 98. In 2014 there were 670 students, with 230 Acushnet students. This reflected a trend of Acushnet students choosing Fairhaven over New Bedford High.

Campus 
The high school campus is located on the north side of Huttleston Avenue (United States Route 6), a short way east of the Acushnet River and New Bedford Harbor. Its main building is a monumental masonry structure in an H-shaped layout, with two full stories, full basement, and a third floor and attic under its pitched slate roofs.  It is predominantly brick, with an ashlar granite foundation and limestone belt courses.  Designed by architect Charles Brigham, it is reminiscent of Tudor architecture with Gothic influences, with a picturesque roofline studded with gables topped by iron finials, and rich carved stonework including gargoyles, grotesques, and depictions of historic figures.  A modern (1996) addition, designed by Flansburgh and Associates, is connected to the east end by a corridor.

Media appearances 
Fairhaven High School has appeared on the reality TV Series, The Principal's Office on truTV.

Notable alumni
Carl Etelman, professional football player
Gil Santos (1956), sports announcer
Milton Silveira, aerospace engineer

See also 
 National Register of Historic Places listings in Bristol County, Massachusetts

References

External links 
 

Fairhaven, Massachusetts
Schools in Bristol County, Massachusetts
Public high schools in Massachusetts
School buildings on the National Register of Historic Places in Massachusetts
National Register of Historic Places in Bristol County, Massachusetts
Educational institutions established in 1905
1905 establishments in Massachusetts